7225 Huntress, provisional designation , is a binary Florian asteroid from the inner regions of the asteroid belt, approximately 6 kilometers in diameter. It was discovered on 22 January 1983, by American astronomer Edward Bowell at Lowell's Anderson Mesa Station in Flagstaff, Arizona, United States. It is named after astrochemist Wesley Huntress.

Classification and orbit 

Huntress is a member of the Flora family, one of the largest families  of stony asteroids. It orbits the Sun in the inner main-belt at a distance of 1.9–2.8 AU once every 3 years and 7 months (1,308 days). Its orbit has an eccentricity of 0.20 and an inclination of 7° with respect to the ecliptic. The first precovery was taken at Palomar in 1960, extending the body's observation arc by 23 years prior to its official discovery observation at Flagstaff.

According to the survey carried out by NASA's Wide-field Infrared Survey Explorer with its subsequent NEOWISE mission, Huntress measures between 5.94 and 6.680 kilometers in diameter and its surface has an albedo between 0.165 and 0.27. The Collaborative Asteroid Lightcurve Link adopts Pravec's revised WISE-data and takes an albedo of 0.1558, a diameter of 6.75 kilometers and an absolute magnitude of 13.49.

Moon and lightcurve 

In December 2007, two rotational lightcurves of Huntress were independently obtained by astronomers Petr Pravec and Donald Pray. Lightcurve analysis gave a rotation period of 2.43995 and 2.4400 hours, respectively. The body's low brightness amplitude of 0.11 magnitude suggest a nearly spheroidal shape. During the photometric observations, it was revealed, that Huntress is a synchronous binary asteroid with an asteroid moon orbiting it every 14.67 hours. The moon's diameter was estimated to be 21% of that of Huntress (or 1.3 kilometers assuming a primary diameter of 6 km).

In March 2012, Australian astronomer David Higgins obtained a concurring lightcurve with period of 2.44 hours and an amplitude of 0.11 magnitude. For an asteroid of its size, Huntress has a relatively short spin rate, not much above the 2.2-hour threshold for fast rotators.

Naming 

This minor planet was named in honor of American astrochemist and space scientist Wesley Huntress (born 1942), who has been NASA's director of space science programs in the 1990s, and has pioneered research relevant to the chemical evolution of interstellar clouds, comets and planetary atmospheres. Naming citation was proposed by the discoverer and published on 8 August 1998.

Notes

References

External links 
 Asteroids with Satellites, Robert Johnston, johnstonsarchive.net
 Asteroid Lightcurve Database (LCDB), query form (info )
 Dictionary of Minor Planet Names, Google books
 Asteroids and comets rotation curves, CdR – Observatoire de Genève, Raoul Behrend
 Discovery Circumstances: Numbered Minor Planets (5001)-(10000) – Minor Planet Center
 
 

Flora asteroids
Huntress
Huntress
Binary asteroids
S-type asteroids (SMASS)
19830122